The Somerset Coalfield in northern Somerset, England is an area where coal was mined from the 15th century until 1973. It is part of a larger coalfield which stretched into southern Gloucestershire. Most of the pits on the coalfield were concentrated in the Cam Brook, Wellow Brook and Nettlebridge Valleys and around Radstock and Farrington Gurney. The pits were grouped geographically, with clusters of pits close together working the same coal seams often under the same ownership. Many pits shared the trackways and tramways which connected them to the Somerset Coal Canal or railways for distribution.

The early pits were adits where coal outcropped or bell pits where coal was close to the surface. These methods were abandoned when deep seams were mined. The deepest shaft on the coalfield was at the Strap mine at Nettlebridge which reached . Flooding and coal dust explosions in some mines required improved ventilation and pumping engines. Several pits closed in the 19th century as the coal was worked out. Those that survived until 1947 became part of the National Coal Board, but the expense of improving equipment and working conditions meant that these became uneconomical and the last pit closed in 1973. There is still evidence of the mine workings, with the remains of buildings, spoil heaps and tramways in the area.

Geology

Structure
It consists of three synclines, informally referred to as 'coal basins'. The Pensford Syncline in the north and the Radstock Syncline in the south are separated by the east–west trending Farmborough Fault Belt. Further to the west is the smaller Nailsea Syncline. The Radstock Syncline in particular is cut by a series of east–west thrust faults and north–south trending normal faults.

Stratigraphy

The Coal Measures are divided into a Lower, Middle and Upper with coal seams found within each of these divisions.

Only in the southern part of the Radstock Syncline have coals of the Lower and Middle Coal Measures been worked, mainly at the Newbury and Vobster collieries in the southeast and in the New Rock and Moorewood pits to the southwest. Only in the eastern part of Pensford Syncline have coals of the Lower and Middle Coal Measures been worked, at the Globe Pit in the Newton St Loe area in the 19th century. The Variscan orogeny involved lateral compression of the rock sequence resulting in the tight folding, fracturing and faulting of the sandstone and mudstone strata, and the associated Coal Measures. The complex geology and thin seams gained the field notoriety and three underground explosions, in 1893, 1895 and 1908 were amongst the first attributable solely to airborne coal dust.

William Smith
Exploratory surveys of the local geology were carried out by William Smith, who became known as the "father of English geology", building on work by John Strachey. Smith worked for the Stracheys who owned Sutton Court, at one of their older mines, the Mearns Pit at High Littleton. As he observed the rock strata at the pit, he realised that they were arranged in a predictable pattern that the various strata could always be found in the same relative positions and each particular stratum could be identified by the fossils it contained and the same succession of fossil groups from older to younger rocks could be found in other parts of England. Smith noticed an easterly dip in the beds of rock—small near the surface (about three degrees) then greater after the Triassic rocks which led to him a testable hypothesis, which he termed the principle of faunal succession, and he began to determine if the relationships between the strata and their characteristics were consistent throughout the country. During work as a surveyor (appointed by engineer John Rennie) for the Somerset Coal Canal Company and subsequently, he mapped the locations of rock strata, and their vertical extent, and drew cross-sections and tables of what he saw and earned the name "Strata Smith".

Coal seams
The following coal seams are recognised within the coalfield. They are listed stratigraphically i.e. uppermost/youngest first. Note that not all seams are continuous across the coalfield and that correlation of some seams from one basin to another is uncertain.

History
It is believed that coal was mined in the area during Roman times and there is documentary evidence of coal being dug on the Mendips in 1305 and at Kilmersdon in 1437. By the time of Henry VIII there were coal pits at Clutton, High Littleton and Stratton-on-the-Fosse.

During the early 17th century coal was largely obtained by excavating the outcrops and driving drifts which followed the seam into the ground. Only small amounts of coal could be obtained by these methods and bell pits were also dug. When all the coal that could safely be extracted from the pit had been recovered, another pit was sunk close by to intersect the seam and the waste from the second pit thrown into the first.

At the beginning of the 19th century there were about 4,000 people employed on the coalfield. The Somerset Miners' Association was founded in 1872, later becoming an area of the National Union of Mineworkers.

The uses of coal were varied. Coal was used in limekilns to produce lime for mortar used in building and by farmers to improve the soil. From 1820 coal was used to produce gas for lighting and to power steam driven woollen mills in the area. Coke was used to dry malt for the brewing industry.

Transport

The coalfield had a relatively low population density and did not have a major coal-consuming industry nearby. Transporting coal to market was a key problem for the coalfield's development. In the pre-turnpike era, the roads serving the coalfield were unsuited to moving coal. Bulley notes "The problem ... was rendered far worse by the state of the roads in Somerset, which were notorious down to the middle of the 18th century. Parishes in the area sometimes neglected or refused to repair those roads which were heavily used by coal carts. Thus in 1617 the inhabitants of Stoke St Michael ... complained that "of late by reason of many coalmines ... the highways there are much in decay and grown very founderous".

In Somerset, turnpike roads began in 1707 with the establishment of the Bath Trust, but turnpikes did not reach the coalfield until the mid-1700s. The Bristol Trust, which passed close to the western boundary of the coalfield, established in 1727 was of little importance, as Bristol was never a significant market, having its own coalfield. Turnpikes facilitated the movement of coal, and John Billingsley enthused "Nothing so much contributes to the improvement of a county as good roads. Before the establishment of turnpikes, many parts of the county were scarcely accessible. ... coal was carried on horses' backs to the distance of fifteen or twenty miles from the colliery; each horse carried about two hundred and half weight. Now one horse with a light cart will draw four hundred weight or four times more than a horse could carry. Can an insignificant toll be put in competition with this saving?"

Not all roads were improved, and in 1819 John Skinner observed roads "rendered bad" by the passage of coal wagons. Expansion of production was limited by access to market. Such a need implied a canal project, following Lord Middleton's dictum "Water transport is what all coal owners must aim at". There were large gains from being connected to a canal system, as stated by the Coal Commission: "At about this period (1800) the system of coal navigation was being rapidly extended, and the result was that coals were gradually finding their way into districts that could not be reached unless at great cost, by road".

A scheme for an extension of the Avon Navigation was proposed in 1766, but canals did not reach the coalfield for almost another 50 years. In 1794 coal proprietors formed a committee to construct the Somerset Coal Canal with two branches into the Cam Brook and Wellow Brook Valleys, and from a junction at Midford, to join the proposed Kennet and Avon Canal at the Dundas Aqueduct near Bath. Coal was transported by the Somerset Coal Canal and later by the Bristol and North Somerset Railway and Somerset and Dorset Joint Railway, which were accessed from the pits by a series of tramways. After 1854, when the first railway line was opened, the tonnage carried by the coal canal declined rapidly.

Decline and closure
The total tonnage of coal produced by the coalfield increased throughout the 19th century, reaching a peak around 1901, when there were 79 separate collieries and production was 1.25 million tons per annum. The peak years for production were 1900 to 1920. However, decline took hold and the number of pits reduced from 30 at the beginning of the 20th century to 14 by the mid-1930s, twelve at nationalisation when the National Coal Board was created on 1 January 1947, under the Coal Industry Nationalisation Act 1946, five in 1959 and none after 1973. Despite some investment in new infrastructure, particularly at Norton Hill, thin seams made production expensive, limiting profit and investment. The conversion of Portishead power station from coal to oil and reduced national demand together with competition from more economical coalfields led to the closure of the last two pits, Kilmersdon and Writhlington, in September 1973.

Area today
Although there are still the remains of mines, disused or redeveloped buildings and a few spoil tips, most have been removed or landscaped, the area has returned to a largely rural nature between the Mendip Hills and the River Avon in north east Somerset. The towns and villages have some light industry but are often commuter towns for Bath and Bristol. There are several limestone quarries particularly in the Mendips.

The Colliers Way (NCR24) national cycle route passes landmarks associated with the coalfield, and other roads and footpaths follow tramways developed during the coal mining years. The cycleway runs from Dundas Aqueduct to Frome via Radstock, and is intended to provide part of a continuous cycle route to Southampton and Portsmouth.

Radstock Museum has exhibits which offer an insight into life in north Somerset since the 19th century. Exhibits relate to the coalfield and its geology. Artefacts and memorabilia from the Somerset Coal Canal, Somerset and Dorset and Great Western Railways are also on display.

Pensford coal basin

The Pensford coal basin is in the northern part of the coalfield around Bishop Sutton, Pensford, Stanton Drew, Farmborough and Hunstrete. At least one pit was operating near Bishop Sutton before 1719. Four bell pits in Bishop Sutton were marked on field tithe No 1409, and four shaft pits on field tithe No 1428, but were no longer working by 1824.

The Old Pit at Bishop Sutton, which was also known as Sutton Top Pit or Upper Sutton Pit was dug before 1799 and owned by Lieutenant Henry Fisher, who sold it in 1821 to Robert Blinman Dowling. After Dowling's death in 1852 the Old Pit was sold to Mr T.T. Hawkes, but he defaulted on the payments and it was sold in 1853 to William Rees-Mogg (ancestor of journalist William Rees-Mogg) and his associates. In 1896 it was owned by F. Spencer of New Rock Colliery, and in 1908 by Jesse Lovell and Sons. By 1921 the pit employed 150 men and boys and produced 10,000 tins per annum. The pit finally closed in 1929.

Pensford Colliery, which opened in 1909, had the latest equipment at the time including coal cutters. It had a red-brick winding house, pithead baths and a coal washery. Faulting made coal production expensive and it closed in 1958.

Earl of Warwick's Clutton Collieries
The Earl of Warwick's estates included sawmills, quarries, brickworks and collieries in addition to agricultural holdings. Bell pits, around Clutton and High Littleton, were described in a survey of 1610. All were closed by 1836. The first deep mine in the parish of High Littleton was Mearns Coalworks which began in 1783. The Greyfield Coal Company did not start until 1833 and expanded after the opening of the Bristol and North Somerset Railway in 1847. Greyfield Colliery closed in 1911, and the railway in 1964. Maynard Terrace in Clutton was built to house some of the miners.

Paulton Basin

Collieries in the Paulton basin were connected to the terminal basin of the northern branch of the Somerset Coal Canal which was the focus for tramroads that connected at least 15 collieries around Paulton, Timsbury and High Littleton.
On the northern side of canal was the terminus for the tramroad which served Old Grove, Prior's, Tyning and Hayeswood pits, with a branch line to Amesbury and Mearns pits. Parts of this line were still in use in 1873, probably carrying horse-drawn wagons of coal. The southern side of the canal basin was connected to the pits at Brittens, Littlebrook, Paulton Ham, Paulton Hill, Simons Hill by a tramway which terminated at Salisbury Colliery. In addition the Paulton Foundry used this line. The entire line was disused by 1871 as were the collieries it served.

The area has been designated as an 'area of special architectural or historic interest, the character or appearance of which it is desirable to preserve or enhance' under section 69 of the Planning (Listed Buildings and Conservation Areas) Act 1990.

Timsbury and Camerton
The first of the collieries around Timsbury village was sunk in 1791 and known as Conygre (Conigre in old spellings). It closed around circa 1898 but the shaft was then used as an airway and escape route for the New Pit, until 1930 when it was closed and capped. In 1928 it was joined underground to Braysdown Colliery and eventually closed in 1950.

There is very little obvious landscape evidence remaining of the previous mining activities around Clutton, Temple Cloud, High Littleton and Timsbury. However, there is a very large Batch almost in the middle of Camerton that is now a designated Local Nature Reserve. The Batch was bare, like the Paulton ones until, according to locals, the wife of the owner of Camerton Court decided to pay for it to be planted with trees to improve the view. There are small batches at Clutton, east of Radford Hill and at Greyfields, High Littleton.

East of Camerton
East of Camerton the coal is buried beneath newer rock strata, which meant that mining in the area was more difficult.

The dominant features of the valleys of the Cam and Wellow Brooks are remnants of coal mining from the 18th to the 20th centuries. In both valleys there are frequent shafts and batches together with the remains of the railway and tram lines that connected the mines to the Avon Valley. Remains of the Somersetshire Coal Canal are also significant reminders of this coal mining history in this area.

Farrington Gurney

Mining around Farrington Gurney has been undertaken since the 17th century where, by 1780, the pits were known as Farrington Colliery.

The main geological feature south of Hallatrow consists of Supra-Pennant Measures which include the upper coal measures and outcrops of sandstone. Relics of its industrial past are evident in the area, including the highly visible and distinct conical shaped Old Mills Batch with its generally unvegetated surface. The three disused colliery sites have been developed for light industry, a depot and a superstore.

Duchy Mines
The Duchy of Cornwall owned most of the mineral rights around Midsomer Norton and various small pits opened around 1750 to exploit these.

Earl Waldegrave's Radstock Collieries

In 1763 coal was discovered in Radstock and mining began on land owned by the Waldegrave family, Lords of the Manor since the English Civil War. In 1896 the pits were owned by the Trustee of Frances, late Countess of Waldegrave.

Radstock was the terminus for the southern branch of the Somerset Coal Canal which was subsequently turned into a tramway and became the centre for railway development and coal depots, coal washeries, workshops and a gas works. As part of the development of the Wiltshire, Somerset and Weymouth Railway, an  line from Radstock to Frome was built to carry coal. In the 1870s the broad-gauge line was converted to standard gauge and connected to the Bristol and North Somerset Line connecting it to the Great Western Railway. The Radstock railway site comprises approximately 8.8 hectares of land which has been subject to planning and development applications.

Writhlington Collieries

The Writhlington Collieries, close to the Waldegrave Collieries, were further east of Radstock and under different ownership. In 1896 they were owned by the Writhlington, Huish and Foxcote Colliery Co., and in 1908 by the Writhlington Collieries Co. Ltd. The Upper and Lower Writhlington, Huish & Foxcote pits were merged into a single colliery.

The base of the Kilmersdon valley consists of alluvium deposits. Above these, on both sides of all of the valleys, is a band of shales and clays from the Penarth group from the Triassic period. Most of the upland in this area is Lias Limestone (white and blue) while the highest part, above 130 m, south of Haydon, is an outcrop of Inferior Oolitic Limestone, both are from the Jurassic period. The steepest slopes of both the Kilmersdon and Snail's Bottom valleys have frequently slipped. Below these rocks are the coal bearing Carboniferous strata. Haydon is an outlying settlement of Radstock built to house miners from the local pit. The disused railway line and inclined railway at Haydon are important elements in the Kilmersdon valley east of Haydon. The modern landscape has a less maintained and 'rougher' character and texture than neighbouring agricultural areas caused mainly by the remnants of the coal industry and its infrastructure and changes in agricultural management. Disturbance caused by coal mining and the railways and the subsequent end of mining and abandonment of the railways has created valuable habitats for nature conservation.

The Writhlington spoil heap or "batch" is a Site of Special Scientific Interest (SSSI) because of the rich collection of fossils in the spoil. The Braysdown batch was planted with conifers, and is known as Braysdown Hill. The offices, blacksmith's shop and stables at the Upper Writhlington Colliery were converted into dwellings.

Norton Hill Collieries
Norton Hill Collieries at Westfield were owned by members of the Beauchamp family such as Sir Frank Beauchamp and his brother Louis Beauchamp who owned other collieries and related works on the coalfield at various times. They were also known as the Beauchamp goldmines as they were the most productive mines in the whole coalfield.

In 1900 a railway linking the colliery to the main Somerset and Dorset Joint Railway was constructed, and sidings laid in 1905 and 1907 which were reconstructed in 1953.

On 9 April 1908 an explosion approximately  underground killed ten men and boys. As there were no mines rescue teams at that time, the manager and volunteers searched for survivors for 10 days. In 1911, partly as a result of the Norton Hill explosion, Winston Churchill was instrumental in the passing of the Coal Mines Act 1911.

After nationalisation after World War II the National Coal Board spent £500,000 on modernising the mine's infrastructure to give it the capability for annual production of 315,000 tons; however, manpower shortages and geological problems caused the pit to close in 1966.

Nettlebridge Valley

There were numerous coal workings in the area from Gurney Slade east to Mells around the villages of Holcombe, Coleford and Stratton-on-the-Fosse. These included at least 52 bell pits, some with deeper shafts and 16 adits. Some coal may have been mined during Roman times and in the 13th century, making them the earliest coal mines in Somerset, but most development occurred in the 17th century. Most mining ended in the 19th century; however, Strap Colliery was opened in 1953 as Mendip Colliery and worked until 1969.

The Vobster Breach colliery had a unique system of long coking ovens which, along with the other buildings, have been designated as a Scheduled monument. The boiler chimney of Oxley's Colliery near Buckland Dinham which operated for a few years in the 1880s is a Grade II listed building.

References

Bibliography

Mining in Somerset
History of Somerset
 
Industrial archaeological sites in Somerset
Coal mines in England
Underground mines in England
Coal mining regions in England